The Two-woman competition at the IBSF World Championships 2021 was held on 5 and 6 February 2021.

Results
The first two runs were started on 5 February at 10:34 and the last two runs on 6 February at 14:34.

References

Two-woman